Events in the year 1973 in Norway.

Incumbents
 Monarch – Olav V
 Prime Minister – Lars Korvald (Christian Democratic Party) until 16 October, Trygve Bratteli (Labour Party)

Events

 21 July – Lillehammer affair: Israeli Mossad agents assassinate a Moroccan waiter in Lillehammer. He had been mistaken for Ali Hassan Salameh, one of the leaders of Black September, the Palestinian group responsible for the 1972's Munich Olympics Massacre, who had been given shelter in Norway. Six Mossad agents were arrested by the Norwegian authorities and the incident became known as the "Lillehammer affair".
 10 September – The 1973 Parliamentary election takes place.
 16 October – Bratteli's Second Cabinet was appointed.
 22 November – 1973 oil crisis: The government approves the weekend closure of all petrol stations.
 5 December – 1973 oil crisis: Driving ban for vehicles on weekends.

Popular culture

Sports

Music 

The popular chart show Norsktoppen debuts on NRK Radio.
 Kirsti Sparboe and Erik Bye win the 1972 Spellemannprisen in the female and male vocalist categories respectively. Popol Vuh, Philharmonic Company Orchestra, Birgitte Grimstad, Einar Schanke, Egil Monn-Iversen, Bør Børson Jr. and Sigurd Jansen also receive the award. Knutsen & Ludvigsen win in the category "Music for children" and Jens Book-Jenssen win the Special Award.

Film

Literature
Aasmund Brynildsen, essayist, biographer and magazine editor, is awarded the Riksmål Society Literature Prize

Notable births

1 January – Jon-Ivar Nygård, politician.
29 January – Lena Jensen, politician
3 February – Heidi Nordby Lunde, politician.
5 March – Eva Kristin Hansen, politician
12 April – Linda Monsen Merkesdal, politician.
18 April – Trude Marstein, author
30 April – Øystein Carlsen, speed skater.
3 May – Per Vidar Kjølmoen, politician.
30 June – Hege Anett Pettersson, handball player (née Hege Johansen).
19 July – Christian Berge, handball player and coach.
17 September – Mona Nilsen, politician.
24 October – Laila Gustavsen, politician
5 September – Heidi Tjugum, handball player.
3 November – Caroline Gedde-Dahl, alpine skier.

Full date missing
Lene Barlie, sport wrestler.

Notable deaths

5 January – Henny Skjønberg, actress and stage director (born 1886)
24 January – Ivar Asbjørn Følling, physician (born 1888)
25 January – Kjeld Langeland, politician (born 1920)
31 January – Ragnar Anton Kittil Frisch, economist and Nobel Prize laureate (born 1895)
31 March – Søren Hans Smith Sørensen, ship-owner and politician (born 1885)
13 April – Ola Olsen, politician (born 1891)
21 April – Johan Jentoft Johansen, politician (born 1906)
30 April
Torgeir Andreas Berge, politician (born 1897)
Ivar Kristiansen Hognestad, politician (born 1888)
30 May – Jørgen Andersen, gymnast and Olympic silver medallist (born 1886)
10 June – Leif Næss, rower and Olympic bronze medallist (born 1923)
11 June – Claes Gill, author, poet and actor (born 1910)
12 June – Tore Holthe, rear admiral (born 1914)
27 June – Odd Nansen, architect, author and humanitarian (born 1901)
30 June – Peter Kjeldseth Moe, politician (born 1909)
3 July – Tor Gjesdal, journalist and civil servant (born 1909).
8 August – Henrik Nielsen, gymnast and Olympic silver medallist (born 1886)
4 September
Martha Frederikke Johannessen, politician (born 1907)
Elise Ottesen-Jensen, sex educator, journalist and anarchist agitator (born 1886)
14 September – Arne Sæter, politician (born 1913)
20 September – Arthur Qvist, horse rider and Olympic silver medallist (born 1896)
24 September – Johan Støa, politician (born 1913)
17 October – Bernt Balchen, polar and aviation pioneer in America (born 1899)
21 October
Conrad Carlsrud, gymnast, track and field athlete and Olympic silver medallist (born 1884)
Arnold Dyrdahl, bobsledder (born 1919)
28 October – Mikkjel Fønhus, writer (born 1894)
10 December – Per Fokstad, teacher, politician and intellectual (born 1890)
17 December – Toralv Kollin Markussen, politician (born 1895)

Full date unknown
Ole Arntzen, businessperson and Milorg leader (b 1910)
Nils Christoffer Bøckman, military officer and businessperson (born 1880)
Eugen Johansen, horse rider and Olympic silver medallist (born 1892)
Emil Løvlien, forest worker, trade unionist and politician (born 1899)
Astrid Tollefsen, poet (born 1897)

See also

References

External links